Daria Gavrilova was the defending champion having won the last edition in 2015, but chose not to participate.
Asia Muhammad won the title, defeating Arina Rodionova in the final, 6–2, 6–1.

Seeds

Main draw

Finals

Top half

Bottom half

References 
 Main draw

Burnie International - Singles
Burnie International